The 2006–07 NHL season saw the Toronto Maple Leafs attempting to recover from a 2005–06 season in which it finished two points out of the final playoff spot in the Eastern Conference.

Offseason
Michael Peca was a major addition to the team for 2006–07, signed from the defending Western Conference champion Edmonton Oilers. However, Peca suffered a broken leg in December after scoring just 4 goals in 35 games.

Goaltender Andrew Raycroft was acquired in a trade from the Boston Bruins to take over the starting job vacancy created by Ed Belfour's departure to the Florida Panthers.

Regular season
On January 4, 2007, the Maple Leafs defeated the Boston Bruins 10–2 away. Alexander Steen scored a hat-trick in the victory. It was the first time that an NHL team had scored ten goals in a regular season game since January 14, 2006, when the Buffalo Sabres defeated the Los Angeles Kings 10–1 at home. It was also the first time that the Maple Leafs had scored ten goals in a regular season game since November 12, 1998, when they defeated the Chicago Blackhawks 10–3 away.

Although they finished in third place in the Northeast Division, the Maple Leafs ultimately failed to qualify for the playoffs after the New York Islanders clinched the eighth and final playoff spot after a 3–2 victory in a shootout to the New Jersey Devils, finishing just one point out of the final playoff spot in the Eastern Conference.

The Maple Leafs tied the Dallas Stars for fewest shorthanded goals scored during the regular season with three.

Season standings

Schedule and results

October

Record for month 6–4–3 (Home 3–3–2  Away 3–1–1)

November

Record for Month 7–6–1 (Home 3–3–0  Away 4–3–1)

December

Record for Month 4–7–2 (Home 3–3–1  Away 1–4–1)

January

Record for month 8–4–0 (Home 2–3–0 Away 6–1–0)

February

Record for month 5–4–3 (Home 1–2–2 Away 4–2–1)

March

Record for month 8–4–2 (Home 7–1–0 Away 1–3–2)

April

Record for month 2–2–0 (Home 2–0–0 Away 0–2–0)

 † Hockey Hall of Fame Game

Playoffs
On April 8, 2007, the New York Islanders defeated the New Jersey Devils in a shootout 3-2, thus clinching an eighth and final playoff spot and eliminating the Leafs from playoff contention. Following the Islanders win, it meant that the Leafs missed the playoffs for the second consecutive year.

Player statistics

Regular season
Scoring

Goaltending

* Mikael Tellqvist was traded to the Phoenix Coyotes on November 29.  Stats reflect games played with the Maple Leafs only.

Transactions

Trades

Free agents acquired

Free agents lost

Claimed off waivers

Draft picks 
Toronto's picks at the 2006 NHL Entry Draft in Vancouver, British Columbia.  The Leafs had the 13th overall draft pick in the 2005–06 NHL season. The Maple Leaf's 2006 draft has been referred to in retrospectives as one of the most successful drafts for any team in league history, as all but one of the team's picks (Tyler Ruegsegger) would go on to become NHL regulars at some point in their careers. Leo Komarov, the 180th pick, would be named an NHL All-Star in 2016.

See also
 2006–07 NHL season

References

 Game log: Toronto Maple Leafs game log on espn.com
 Team standings: NHL standings on espn.com
 Player Stats: Toronto Maple Leafs 2006–07 Reg. Season Stats on espn.com
 Draft Picks: 2006 NHL Entry Draft

Toronto Maple Leafs seasons
Toronto Maple Leafs season, 2006-07
Toronto